Eupithecia costiconvexa is a moth in the family Geometridae. It is found in Japan (Honshu, Shikoku, Kyushu, Tsushima, Yakushima) and Thailand.

References

Moths described in 1979
costiconvexa
Moths of Asia